The 1988 Brazilian motorcycle Grand Prix was the last round of the 1988 Grand Prix motorcycle racing season. It took place on the weekend of 15–17 September 1988 at the Goiânia circuit.

500 cc race report

Wayne Gardner was on pole, but Eddie Lawson got into the lead at the start, ahead of Wayne Rainey and Kevin Schwantz. Back in 6th place, Gardner was almost cut off by Pierfrancesco Chili, who tried a block pass on him; Gardner shook a fist.

Schwantz got around Lawson for 1st, but Lawson looked like he's not going to let it go. Gardner caught up to make it a trio, while Lawson retook the lead. Randy Mamola was hot-dogging, deliberately sliding the rear.
Schwantz and Gardner went at it for 2nd place. Mamola almost highsided trying to impress the crowd, a bit later on a left-hander he looked over his shoulder and immediately slid the bike into a highside. Schwantz will do something similar next year at Phillip Island. Rainey retired with a punctured tire.

500cc classification

References

Brazilian motorcycle Grand Prix
Brazilian
Motorcycle Grand Prix